Reginald Armstrong Bell (16 September 1913 – 7 August 2009) was an Australian rules footballer who played with Hawthorn in the Victorian Football League (VFL).

Notes

External links 

1913 births
2009 deaths
Australian rules footballers from Victoria (Australia)
Hawthorn Football Club players
Oakleigh Football Club players